HMS President was a 34-gun fourth-rate of the English Navy, built by Peter Pett I at Deptford Dockyard and launched in 1650. She was incorporated into the Commonwealth Navy in 1650. She partook in the Battle off Dover and Kentish Knock in 1652, the Battle of Portland, the Gabbard and Scheveningen in 1653. She was renamed Bonaventure in 1660. After the Restoration she was incorporated into the Royal Navy. She was present at the Battle of Lowestoft (1665), the Four Days Battle and the Oxfordness in 1666. She was rebuilt in 1666. She was present at the Battle of Martinique in 1667, Battle of Solebay (1672), Battle of Schooneveld and Texel in 1673, the Battle of Beachy Head in 1690, the Battle of Barfleur 1692.

President was the second named vessel since it was used for a 26-gun ship, purchased in 1645 and sold in 1656. Known as Old President from 1650.Bonaventure was the fourth named vessel since it was used for a warship built in 1489 and gone by 1509.

Construction
She was ordered in April 1649 as part of the 1649 Programme to be built at Deptford Dockyard under the guidance of Master Shipwright Peter Pett I. She was launched 9 April 1650. Her dimensions were  gundeck with  keel reported for tonnage, breadth , depth of hold . Her builder's measured tonnage would be  tons. Her armament when built would be 38 guns of various calibres. Her armament would vary between 38 and 48 guns during her career.

Commissioned service
Service with Commonwealth Navy
She was commissioned into the Commonwealth Navy under the command of Captain Anthony Young in 1650 for service on the West coast.

First Anglo-Dutch War
She was in action with the Dutch off the Start on 12 May. The action off the Start led to the Battle of Dover. She was the leader of Captain Young's detachment of three ships on 19 May 1652. This battle is sometimes recorded as the Battle of Goodwin Sands. On 28 September 1652 she participated in the Battle of Kentish Knock. Later in 1652 she was under the command of Captain Thomas Graves. At the Battle of Portland she was a member of Robert Blake's Fleet of eighty-four ships from 18 to 20 February 1653. This British victory secured control over the English Channel. The Dutch lost eight warships and forty merchant vessels. In 1653 she was under the command of Captain Francis Parker. A few months later she was at the Battle of the Gabbard as part of Blue Squadron, Center Division under the command of Vice-Admiral James Peacock, on 2–3 June 1653. The British were victorious on the first day. When Admiral Tromp attempted to reattack on the 3rd he withdrew when a squadron of eighteen ships arrived under the command of Robert Blake. This fight was followed by the Battle of Scheveningen where she was a member of Red Squadron, Van Division under the command of Vice-Admiral James Peacock on 31 July 1653. Later she spent the winter of 1653/54 with the east coast colliers.

In 1656 she was under Captain Benjamin Sacheverell until he died later that year then Captain Richard Potter took over.

Service after the Restoration May 1660
In 1660 she was renamed Bonaventure. On 11 August 1662 she was under the command of Captain Sir William Berkeley. In early 1663 she was docked at Chatham to be rebuilt.

Chatham 1663 Rebuild
She was rebuilt at Chatham Dockyard in 1663 under the guidance of Master Shipwright Sir Phineas Pett. She was launched in late 1663. Her dimensions were  gundeck with  keel reported for tonnage, breadth , depth of hold . Her builder's measured tonnage would be 514 tons. Her armament when built would be 38 guns of various calibres. Her armament would vary between 38 and 48 guns during her career.

Her armament was changed to 48 (wartime)/ 42 (peacetime) guns consisting of twenty-two culverinsA culverin was a gun of 4,500 pounds with a 5.5 inch bore firing a 17.5 pound shot with a 12 pound powder charge on the lower deck (LD), sixteen demi-culverinsA demi-culverin was a gun of 3,400 pounds with a four inch bore firing a 9.5 pound shot with an eight pound powder charge. on the upper deck (UD) and ten sakersA sacar or saker was a gun of 1,400 pounds with a 3.5 inch bore firing a 5.5 pound shot with an 5.5 pound powder charge. on the quarterdeck (QD). In 1677 the armament would be changed to twenty-two culverins on the lower deck (LD), twenty 8-pounder guns8-pounder was a captured Dutch weapon. on the upper deck (UD) and six sakers on the quarterdeck (QD)</ref>.

Service after rebuild 1663
She was commissioned on 19 November 1663 under the command of Captain Arthur Laughorne. She sailed with Admiral Sir Thomas Allin's squadron to the Mediterranean in 1664. She went aground in a storm at Gibraltar on 3 December 1664, however was salved and repaired at Cadiz, Spain.

Second Anglo-Dutch War
She participated in the Battle of Lowestoft as a member of Red Squadron, Rear Division under the command of Rear-Admiral Sir William Berkeley, on 3 June 1665. She was at the Battle of Vagen (Bergen, Norway) on 3 August 1665, however, was unable to enter the harbour therefore unable to participate in the action. On 14 June 1665 Captain John Waterworth took command. On 4 June she joined the Four Days' Battle' as a member of Prince Rupert's Squadron, Van division under the command of Vice-Admiral Sir Christopher Myngs. As a member of Blue Squadron, Center Division under the command of Admiral Sir Jeremy Smith, she was at the St James Day Battle from 25 to 6 July 1666.

She sailed to the West Indies in the spring of 1667 with Rear-Admiral Sir John Harman's Squadron. She participated in the Battle of Martinique on 24/25 June 1667. On 2 July 1667 Captain William Hammond took command until he was killed at Surinam on 7 October 1667. Captain John Narborough took over on 30 October 1667.

Third Anglo-Dutch War
On 9 January 1672 Captain Richard Trevanion took command. She participated in the Battle of Solebay as a member of Blue squadron, Van Division under command of Rear-Admiral Sir John Kempthorne, on 28 May 1673. On 13 June 1672 Captain Henry Killigrew took command. While commanding she partook in the Battle of Schooneveld on 28 May and 4 June 1673. This was followed by the Battle of Texel on 11 August 1673.

On 17 August 1673 Captain John Wood took command to escort a convoy to Gibraltar in October 1674. She remained in the Mediterranean until the end of the year when she returned home. In 1682 she was docked at Portsmouth to be rebuilt.

Rebuild at Portsmouth 1683
She was rebuilt at Portsmouth in 1683 un the guidance of Master Shipwright Isaac Betts. She was floated out of dock in 1683. Her dimensions after the second rebuild were  keel reported for tonnage, breadth , depth of hold . Her builder's measured tonnage would be  tons. Her armament was changed to 52 guns, consisting of twenty-two 12-pounder guns on the lower deck, twenty-two 8-pounder guns on the upper deck and two sakers on the quarterdeck. In the 1696 survey she carried only 40 guns consisting of eighteen 12-pounder guns on the lower deck, twenty 6-pounder guns on the upper deck and 2 minions on the quarterdeck.

Service after rebuild 1683
She was commissioned on 14 May 1683 under the command of Captain Henry Priestman. She was at the evacuation of Tangiers followed by the evacuation of Sale, Morocco. In 1685, while Captain Priestman was ill Captain Stafford Fair-bourne took command. She was in a boat action at Mamora on 12 June 1685. In 1688 She was under Captain Thomas Hopson with Dartmouth's Fleet in October the partook in Londonderry operations in 1689. In 1690 she was under the command of Captain John Hubbard. She participated in the Battle of Beachy Head on 30 June 1690 as a member of Blue Squadron. This was followed by the Battle of Barfleur from 19 to 24 May 1692 as a member of Red Squadron. In 1896 she sailed to Hudson Bay to recapture Fort York under the command of Captain William Allen. She was in action against the former Mary Rose on 24 October 1696 during which Captain Allen was killed. Captain Vincent Cutter sailed her to Newfoundland in 1697. She was docked at Woolwich for rebuilding in 1699.

Rebuild at Woolwich 1699
She was rebuilt at Woolwich in 1698 under the guidance of Master Shipwright Fisher Harding. She was floated out of dock in 1699. Her dimensions after the third rebuild were  gundeck with  keel reported for tonnage, breadth , depth of hold . Her builder's measured tonnage would be  tons. Her armament was changed to 50 guns, consisting of twenty 12-pounder guns on the lower deck, twenty 6-pounder guns on the upper deck, six 6-pounder guns on the quarterdeck and two 6-pounder guns on the foc'x'le (Fc). Her peacetime armament would remove two guns from the lower deck, the upper deck and the quarterdeck.

Service after rebuild 1699
She commissioned in 1701 under the command of Captain Fleetwood Ernes for a voyage to Guinea. She was with Shovel's Squadron in October 1702. In 1703 Captain Edward Rumsey took command for convoys to Newfoundland and the West Indies. During 1704 thru 06 she was in the North Sea followed by Whetstone's squadron in 1707. Captain Philip Boys took over in 1708 and sailed with Baker's squadron on the Dutch coast then sailed in Scottish waters.

Disposition
She was docked at Chatham in 1711 for a rebuild, however, this rebuild was actually registered as new construction

Notes

Citations

References

 A Journal of the Swedish Embassy, in the Years MDCLIII and MDCLIV from the Commonwealth of England, Scotland, and Ireland, Volym 1, T. Becket and P.A. de Hondt, 1772 
Lavery, Brian (2003) The Ship of the Line - Volume 1: The development of the battlefleet 1650-1850.'' Conway Maritime Press. .
 British Warships in the Age of Sail (1603 – 1714), by Rif Winfield, published by Seaforth Publishing, England © 2009, EPUB 
 Fleet Actions, 1.1 Battle off Dover 19 May 1652
 Fleet Actions, 1.3 The Battle of Kentish Knock 28 September 1652
 Fleet Actions, 1.5 Battle off Portland (the 'Three Days Battle') 18–20 February 1653
 Fleet Actions, 1.7 Battle of the Gabbard (North Foreland) 2–3 June 1653
 Fleet Actions, 1.8 Battle of Scheveningen (off Texel) 31 July 1653
 Fleet Actions, 3.1 Battle of Lowestoft 3 June 1665
 Fleet Actions, 3.2 Battle of Vagen (Bergen, Norway 3 August 1665
 Fleet Actions, 3.3 The Battle of the Galloper Sand ('the Four Days' Battle') 1–4 June 1666
 Fleet Actions, 3.4 Battle of Orfordness ('the St James Day Battle') 25–6 July 1666
 Fleet Actions, 3.8 The Battle of Martinique 24/25 June 1667
 Fleet Actions, 5.2 Battle of Solebay (Southwold Bay) 28 May 1672
 Fleet Actions, 5.3 Battle of Schooneveld 28 May and 4 June 1673
 Fleet Actions, 5.5 The Battle of Texel 1673
 Fleet Actions, 6.2 The Battle of Beachy Head 30 June 1690
 Fleet Actions, 6.3 Battle of Barfleur 19–22 May 1692
 Chapter 4, The Fourth Rates - 'Small Ships', Vessels acquired from 24 March 1603, 1649 Programme, President
 Chapter 4, The Fourth Rates - 'Small Ships', Vessels acquired from 2 May 1660, Rebuilt Vessels (1663-66), Bonaventure
 Chapter 4, The Fourth Rates - 'Small Ships', Vessels acquired from 2 May 1660, Rebuilt Vessels (1681-87), Bonaventure
 Chapter 4, The Fourth Rates - 'Small Ships', Vessels acquired from 18 December 1688, Inter-War (1697-1702 Rebuilding Programme, 48-gun Type, Bonaventure
 Ships of the Royal Navy, by J.J. Colledge, revised and updated by Lt-Cdr Ben Warlow and Steve Bush, published by Seaforth Publishing, Barnsley, Great Britain, © the estate of J.J. Colledge, Ben Warlow and Steve Bush 2020, EPUB , (EPUB), Section B (Bonaventure), Section P (President)
 The Arming and Fitting ofEnglish Ships of War 1800 - 1815, by Brian Lavery, published by US Naval Institute Press © Brian Lavery 1989, Part V Guns, Type of Guns

Ships of the line of the Royal Navy
Ships built in Deptford
1600s ships